This is a list of memorials to Woodrow Wilson, the 28th president of the United States.

Academic buildings
Wilson House, an undergraduate dormitory at Johns Hopkins University, is named in his honor.
Wilson Hall, an administrative building at James Madison University, is named in his honor.
Woodrow Wilson Hall at Monmouth University

Educational institutions
Wilson Workforce and Rehabilitation Center- a vocational school for disabled individuals located in Fishersville, Virginia
Woodrow Wilson High School (over 10 locations)
Woodrow Wilson International Center for Scholars
Woodrow Wilson Middle School
Woodrow Wilson School of Public and International Affairs (repealed by Princeton University in 2020)
Wilson College (now named First College), a residential college of Princeton University
Baker Montessori School (formerly Woodrow Wilson Montessori School and Woodrow Wilson Elementary School), renamed in 2021

Statues
Woodrow Wilson Monument in Prague, Czech Republic
Woodrow Wilson Statue, Wilson Park in Poznań, Poland
Statue of Woodrow Wilson (Austin, Texas) (removed in 2015)
Bust of Woodrow Wilson in Sofia, Bulgaria

Military vessels
USS Woodrow Wilson (SSBN-624), a Lafayette-class ballistic missile submarine

Transportation
The  in Paris, France
Boulevard Wilson, a main street in Strasbourg, France
Avenue du Président Wilson in Calais, France
 "Wilson Bridge" (Wilsonův most), bridge across the Radbuza in Plzeň
Wilson's Promenade, the most popular walking avenue in Sarajevo, Bosnia and Herzegovina
 Wilson Street (Wilsonova), street in Prague
Woodrow Wilson Avenue, a main street in Jackson, Mississippi
Woodrow Wilson Bridge across the Potomac River
Woodrow Wilsonplein, a square in Ghent, Belgium
In recognition of his signing on March 2, 1917 the "Jones Act" that granted United States citizenship to Puerto Ricans, streets in several Puerto Rican municipalities were renamed "Calle Wilson", including one in the Mariani neighborhood in Ponce and the Condado section of San Juan.
Woodrow Wilson Boulevard, located in the Belgrade Waterfront, Serbia

Other

The Hotel President Wilson, in Geneva, Switzerland
The Palais Wilson in Geneva is the current headquarters of the Office of the United Nations High Commissioner for Human Rights; the Quai Wilson is a street nearby, on the west shore of Lake Geneva.
Plac Wilsona, a square in northwestern Warsaw
 Park Wilsona, city park in Poznań
Woodrow Wilson Boyhood Home
Woodrow Wilson House
Woodrow Wilson Presidential Library
Woodrow Wilson International Center for Scholars, part of the Smithsonian Institution
Woodrow Wilson Pub in Carlisle, England, named after the president due to his ancestral link to the city. His mother, Janet was born in Carlisle in 1826. He visited Carlisle in 1918 on a "pilgrimage of the heart".
Woodrow Wilson Service Area- New Jersey Turnpike rest stop located in Hamilton Township, New Jersey
The "Président Wilson" is a rowing rescue boat, built in 1918, belonging to the life guard in Lutry, Switzerland.

See also
 Presidential memorials in the United States

References 

Wilson, Woodrow place names
Wilson, Woodrow
Wilson